Lisin was an ancient Sumerian goddess. Lisin may also refer to
Lisin (surname) 
Lisen or Lisin, a village in Iran